José Diogo Macedo da Silva (born 3 February 1994), known as Didi, is a Portuguese footballer who plays for Vitória Guimarães B as a midfielder.

Club career
Born in Guimarães, Didi spent his youth career at Vitória de Guimarães, where he started in 2008. In 2013, he joined Benfica B but did not play any match in Segunda Liga, before moving to Braga in the next season.

On 8 December 2014, Didi made his professional debut with Braga B in a 2014–15 Segunda Liga match against Sporting Covilhã.

References

External links
 
 Stats and profile at LPFP 
 

1994 births
Living people
Portuguese footballers
Association football midfielders
Liga Portugal 2 players
Campeonato de Portugal (league) players
S.L. Benfica B players
S.C. Braga B players
F.C. Arouca players
Vitória S.C. B players
Sportspeople from Guimarães